Wanxin Zhang (born 1961) is a Chinese sculpturer who is based out of San Francisco. Zhang's work is in the Smithsonian American Art Museum Collections. 

Zhang was born in Changchun, China in 1961. Zhang attended Lu Xun Academy of Fine Art and was a part of the first generation to get a formal art education after the cultural revolution. Zhang's work is inspired by Chinese culture, such as Chinese opera, and his experience living in the United States. Zhang left China in 1992 and moved to California, where he started working at the Artworks Foundry in Berkeley. The Artworks Foundry's founder Peter Voulkos and artist Robert Arneson have also been cited as influences. Zhang works as an instructor at the San Francisco Art Institute.

In 2008, Zhang's piece "Pit #5" was on display in the Art Beatus Gallery in Hong Kong. In 2011, the Bellevue Arts Museum held the first in-depth survey of Zhang's work with the exhibit titled "Wanxin Zhang: A Ten Year Survey." Zhang's piece "Panda Warrior" was on display at Hong Kong's Jingyixuan Gallery in 2012.  In 2014, Zhang participated in a panel called "RISE UP! Art As Action: A Panel Discussion" with artists Chester Arnold and Michele Pred. Zhang, Arnold, and Pred were chosen for the panel since their work was featured in San Francisco Arts Education Project’s exhibition "Rise Up! Art As Action."

From December 2017 to January 2018, Zhang's “Wanxin Zhang: Fahrenheit" exhibit was on display at the Catharine Clark Gallery. In 2018, Zhang's exhibit "40x40" was on display at the Sonoma State University Art Gallery. In 2019, Zhang had a solo exhibit at the San Francisco’s Museum of Craft and Design titled “Wanxin Zhang: The Long Journey” that ran from April to July. He also had a joint exhibit with ceramicist Richard Shaw at the Sonoma Valley Museum of Art titled “Richard Shaw and Wanxin Zhang.”

In 2021, Zhang’s piece "Warrior with Color Face" became part of the Smithsonian American Art Museum's collection for the exhibit "This Present Moment: Crafting a Better World". The piece was a gift in honor of the 50th anniversary of the Renwick Gallery. It was also inspired by Zhang's study of the Terracotta Army in Xi'an. In 2022, Zhang's solo exhibit "Wanxin Zhang: Witness" was on display at the Catharine Clark Gallery. His artwork was also on display at the 2022 Seattle Art Fair. Zhang's ceramic sculpture "Color Face" will be featured in an outdoor group sculpture exhibition called "Claiming Space: Refiguring the Body in Landscape" in 2023. The exhibit also features artists such as Alison Saar, Pilar Agüero-Esparza, and Hank Willis Thomas.

Some of Zhang's work is also in the Holter Museum of Art's permanent collection.

References 

People from Changchun
Chinese sculptors
San Francisco Art Institute faculty
Art educators
1961 births
Living people

External links 
 Zhang's Official Website